Thermochrous melanoneura is a species of moth of the Anomoeotidae family. It is found in Malawi.

References

Endemic fauna of Malawi
Anomoeotidae
Lepidoptera of Malawi
Moths of Sub-Saharan Africa